Omar Haji Saad (born 12 October 1949) is a Malaysian former cyclist. He competed in the individual road race and team time trial events at the 1972 Summer Olympics.

References

External links
 

1949 births
Living people
Malaysian male cyclists
Olympic cyclists of Malaysia
Cyclists at the 1972 Summer Olympics
Place of birth missing (living people)
Asian Games medalists in cycling
Cyclists at the 1970 Asian Games
Cyclists at the 1974 Asian Games
Medalists at the 1970 Asian Games
Asian Games silver medalists for Malaysia
20th-century Malaysian people
21st-century Malaysian people